Damian Emmanuel Migueles (born 24 November 1983) is an Argentine handball player. He was born in Buenos Aires. He defended Argentina at the men's 2012 London Summer Olympics handball tournament.

References

External links

1983 births
Living people
Argentine male handball players
Olympic handball players of Argentina
Handball players at the 2012 Summer Olympics
Sportspeople from Buenos Aires
Handball players at the 2007 Pan American Games
Handball players at the 2011 Pan American Games
Handball players at the 2015 Pan American Games
Pan American Games medalists in handball
Pan American Games gold medalists for Argentina
Pan American Games silver medalists for Argentina
Medalists at the 2007 Pan American Games
Medalists at the 2015 Pan American Games
Medalists at the 2011 Pan American Games
21st-century Argentine people